Pampisford Hall is a country house designed by George Goldie in the civil parish of Pampisford in the English county of Cambridgeshire. It became a Grade II listed building on 29 October 1974. The hall's gates and gate piers are also Grade II listed.

The gardens are Grade II* listed on the Register of Historic Parks and Gardens. They are not open to the public.

References

George Goldie buildings
Country houses in Cambridgeshire
Grade II listed houses
Grade II listed buildings in Cambridgeshire
Grade II* listed parks and gardens in Cambridgeshire